There were two Governments of the 32nd Dáil, which was elected at the general election held on 26 February 2016. The 30th Government of Ireland (6 May 2016 – 14 June 2017) was led by Enda Kenny as Taoiseach and the 31st Government of Ireland (14 June 2017 – 27 June 2020) was led by Leo Varadkar as Taoiseach. They were minority governments with Fine Gael and Independent TDs at cabinet, reliant on the support of other Independent TDs, and a confidence and supply arrangement with Fianna Fáil. It was the first time Fine Gael had returned to government after a general election, and the succession of Varadkar as Taoiseach in 2017 was the first time a Fine Gael leader had succeeded a party colleague as Taoiseach within a Dáil term.

The general election for the 33rd Dáil took place on 8 February 2020. The 33rd Dáil met for the first time on 20 February 2020. Leo Varadkar was proposed as Taoiseach, and was defeated, but no other candidate was successfully nominated. Varadkar tendered his resignation to the president, but the 31st Government continued to carry out its duties until the new government was appointed on 27 July 2020.

The 30th Government lasted  days. The 31st Government lasted  days from its appointment until its resignation on 20 February 2020, and continued to carry out its duties for a further 128 days until the appointment of its successor, giving a total of  days.

30th Government of Ireland

Nomination of Taoiseach
The 32nd Dáil first met on 10 March 2016. In debate on the nomination of Taoiseach, four candidates were proposed. None of the motions proposing these candidates were successful. Fine Gael leader and outgoing Taoiseach Enda Kenny resigned as Taoiseach, with the government continuing in a caretaker capacity to carry out its duties until its successors would be appointed. On 6 April and 14 April, further votes were taken on proposals to nominate candidates for the position of Taoiseach, with no candidate successful. On 6 May, a motion proposing Enda Kenny for appointment as Taoiseach was approved by the Dáil. Kenny was re-appointed as Taoiseach by President Michael D. Higgins.

Members of the Government
After his appointment as Taoiseach by the president, Enda Kenny proposed the members of the government and they were approved by the Dáil. They were appointed by the president on the same day.

Changes to Departments

Attorney General
Máire Whelan SC was appointed by the president as Attorney General on the nomination of the Taoiseach.

Ministers of State
On 6 May 2016, the government on the nomination of the Taoiseach appointed Regina Doherty, Paul Kehoe and Finian McGrath as Ministers of State in attendance at cabinet but without a vote. On 19 May 2016, the government on the nomination of the Taoiseach appointed 15 further Ministers of State.

Budget
The Minister for Finance, Michael Noonan, and the Minister for Public Expenditure and Reform, Paschal Donohoe, delivered the 2017 budget on 11 October 2016.

Confidence in the government
On 15 February 2017, a motion of confidence in the government proposed by Taoiseach Enda Kenny was approved with 57 votes in favour to 52 against and 44 registered abstentions.

Resignation
On 17 May 2017, Enda Kenny resigned as leader of Fine Gael. Leo Varadkar succeeded him as leader in a party leadership election concluding on 2 June. On 13 June, Kenny resigned as Taoiseach.

31st Government of Ireland

Nomination of Taoiseach
After the resignation of Enda Kenny as Taoiseach on the previous day, on 14 June 2017, Leo Varadkar was proposed for the nomination of the Dáil for the position of Taoiseach. This motion was approved and Varadkar was appointed by President Michael D. Higgins. Varadkar was the first Fine Gael leader to succeed a party colleague as Taoiseach within a Dáil term.

Members of the Government
After his appointment as Taoiseach by the president, Leo Varadkar proposed the members of the government and they were approved by the Dáil. They were appointed by the president on the same day.

Changes to Departments

Attorney General
Séamus Woulfe SC was appointed by the president as Attorney General on the nomination of the Taoiseach.

Ministers of State
On 14 June 2017, the government on the nomination of the Taoiseach appointed Joe McHugh, Mary Mitchell O'Connor, Paul Kehoe and Finian McGrath as Ministers of State in attendance at cabinet but without a vote. On 20 June, the government on the nomination of the Taoiseach appointed 15 further Ministers of State.

Constitutional referendums
The Thirty-sixth Amendment was proposed by Minister for Health Simon Harris and approved in a referendum on 25 May 2018. It replaced the protection of the right of the unborn with a clause allowing the termination of pregnancy to be regulated by law. It was followed by the Health (Regulation of Termination of Pregnancy) Act 2018.

The Thirty-seventh Amendment was proposed by Minister for Justice and Equality Charlie Flanagan and approved in a referendum on 26 October 2018. It removed the offence of blasphemy from the Constitution. It was followed by the Blasphemy (Abolition of Offences and Related Matters) Act 2019.

The Thirty-eighth Amendment had been proposed by Josepha Madigan as a private member's bill before her appointment to government, and proposed to reduce the waiting period for divorce. It was supported by the Minister for Justice and Equality, who amended it remove the reference to a required period of separation before divorce, and to regulate foreign divorce. It was approved in a referendum on 24 May 2019 and was followed by the Family Law Act 2019.

Budgets
The Minister for Finance and Minister for Public Expenditure and Reform, Paschal Donohoe, delivered the following budgets:
 2018 budget, delivered on 10 October 2017
 2019 budget, delivered on 9 October 2018
 2020 budget, delivered on 8 October 2019

Confidence in the government
On 25 September 2018, a motion of no confidence in the Minister for Housing, Planning and Local Government Eoghan Murphy proposed by Eoin Ó Broin for Sinn Féin was defeated, with 49 votes in favour to 59 votes against and 29 registered abstentions.

On 20 February 2019, a motion of no confidence in the Minister for Health Simon Harris proposed by Louise O'Reilly for Sinn Féin was defeated, with 53 votes in favour to 58 votes against and 37 registered abstentions.

On 3 December 2019, a motion of no confidence in the Minister for Housing, Planning and Local Government Eoghan Murphy proposed by Catherine Murphy for the Social Democrats was defeated, with 53 votes in favour to 56 votes against and 35 registered abstentions.

Dissolution and resignation
On 14 January, Taoiseach Leo Varadkar sought a dissolution of the Dáil which was granted by the president, with the new Dáil to convene on 20 February at 12 noon. The general election took place on 8 February.

The 33rd Dáil first met on 20 February. Leo Varadkar, Fianna Fáil leader Micheál Martin, Sinn Féin leader Mary Lou McDonald and Green Party leader Eamon Ryan were each proposed for nomination as Taoiseach. None of the four motions were successful. Leo Varadkar announced that he would resign as Taoiseach but under the provisions of Article 28.11 of the Constitution, the government continued to carry out their duties until their successors were appointed.

On 27 June, Micheál Martin was nominated by the Dáil for appointment as Taoiseach by the President.

Response to COVID-19
The government proposed two pieces of legislation in response to the coronavirus pandemic which were passed by the Oireachtas: the Health (Preservation and Protection and other Emergency Measures in the Public Interest) Act 2020, enacted on 20 March, and the Emergency Measures in the Public Interest (COVID-19) Act 2020, enacted on 27 March. These were the first legislation to have been passed through the Oireachtas while after a government had resigned. Regulations were first introduced by Minister for Health Simon Harris on 8 April.

See also
Politics of the Republic of Ireland

References

2016 establishments in Ireland
32nd Dáil
Cabinets established in 2016
32
Minority governments